Schreier is a surname  of German origin. Notable people with the surname include:

Christian Schreier (born 1959), German footballer
Dan Moses Schreier, American sound designer and composer
Jake Schreier, American director
Józef Schreier, Polish mathematician
Otto Schreier (1901-1929), Austrian mathematician
Peter Schreier (1935–2019), German tenor and conductor
Richard Schreier, Canadian engineer
Sandy Schreier, American fashion historian and collector
Jason Schreier, American journalist and author

See also
 Schreyer 
 Shrayer
 Shroyer, Pennsylvania German form
 Shrier, Americanized version

German-language surnames